Chaya Manush (2014) is a Bengali para-psychological thriller film directed by Arindam Mamdo Dey and produced by Pankaj Agarwal under the banner of PB Films Limited.

Story 
Rahul (Parambrata Chattopadhyay), once a popular author, is suffering from writer's block. His wife and son leave him. Drowned in debt, he is frustrated and angry with himself. His only friend is Trisha (Paoli Dam), a journalist, who he can fall back on in times of need. One day, Rahul accidentally meets his old friend Arko (Debdut Dutta), who is now a film producer with pots of money. Arko invites him over for a drink and requests Rahul to listen to his life story. Rahul, reluctantly, decides to hear him out. There, he has a strange encounter with Pranotosh Dayal Dinobondhu (Kaushik Ganguly), who apparently knows everything about their lives. Arko calls Dayal evil and warns Rahul not to fall into his trap.

Cast 
 Parambrata Chattopadhyay
 Soumitra Chatterjee
 Raima Sen
 Paoli Dam
 Kaushik Ganguly
 Debdoot Dutta

References 
 Chaya Manush On Times Of India

Bengali-language Indian films
2010s Bengali-language films
2014 films
Films scored by Anupam Roy